Lullaby is the eighth studio album and debut children's album by American recording artist Jewel, released on May 5, 2009 by Somerset Entertainment, through Fisher-Price Records. It is her first-ever independent release. The album has sold 37,000 copies in the United States as of June 2010.

Background
Produced by Jewel and recorded at the singer's home studio in Stephenville, Texas, Lullaby contains 10 self-penned songs as well as covers of popular nursery rhymes and lullabies. Jewel stated:

"This isn't just a 'kids' album, it's really a mood album—perfect to relax to at the end of a long day. It will soothe and lull children, but was also written and sung for adults to enjoy and unwind with."

Promotion
In support of the album Jewel appeared on Live with Regis and Kelly, The Tonight Show with Jay Leno, Today, The Bonnie Hunt Show, and more.

Track listing
"Raven" – 4:07
"All the Animals" – 2:46
"Sweet Dreams" – 4:16
"Twinkle Twinkle Little Star" – 3:04
"Circle Song" – 3:47
"The Cowboy's Lament" – 3:59
"Daydream Land" – 3:10
"Sov Gott (Sleep Well)" – 4:44
"Dreamer" – 4:23
"Forever and a Day (Always)" – 3:15
"Gloria" – 6:09
"Somewhere Over the Rainbow" – 4:25
"Angel Standing By" – 2:45
"Simple Gifts" – 2:47
"Brahms Lullaby" – 4:45

Personnel
 Jonathan Ahrens - upright bass
 Jason Freese - accordion, mellotron, piano, triangle
 Ken Halford - acoustic guitar
 Jewel - acoustic guitar, lead vocals, background vocals
 Jonathan Yudkin - bass guitar, cello, celtic harp, charango, flute, acoustic guitar, mandolin, peruvian flute, shruti box, string arrangements, string bass, string composer, viola, violin

Charts

Certifications

References

2009 albums
Children's music albums by American artists
Jewel (singer) albums